Cryptomeria mabillei is the only species in the monotypic moth genus Cryptomeria of the family Erebidae. It is found on Madagascar. Both the genus and the species were first described by Saalmüller in 1880.

References

Calpinae